Yuliya Rodionova (born January 11, 1990 in Oskemen) is a Kazakh freestyle skier, specializing in Moguls .

Rodionova competed at the 2006 and 2010 Winter Olympics for Kazakhstan. Her best finish came in 2010, when she placed 22nd in the qualifying round of the moguls, failing to advance. In 2006, she finished 28th in the preliminary round, and did not advance.

As of April 2013, her best showing at the World Championships is 8th, in the 2009 dual moguls event.

Rodionova made her World Cup debut in December 2004. As of April 2013, her best World Cup event finish is 8th place, in the dual moguls event at Meribel in 2010/11. Her best World Cup overall finish in moguls is 25th, in 2008/09 and 2009/10.

References

1990 births
Living people
Olympic freestyle skiers of Kazakhstan
Freestyle skiers at the 2006 Winter Olympics
Freestyle skiers at the 2010 Winter Olympics
Sportspeople from Oskemen
Kazakhstani female freestyle skiers
Asian Games medalists in freestyle skiing
Freestyle skiers at the 2011 Asian Winter Games
Asian Games silver medalists for Kazakhstan
Medalists at the 2011 Asian Winter Games